Andrew Stevenson Murr (born April 23, 1977) is an American attorney, rancher and politician serving as a member of the Texas House of Representatives from the 53rd district. Elected in 2014, he assumed office in 2015. His maternal grandfather was Coke Stevenson, the 35th Governor of Texas.

Early life and education 
Murr was raised on a farm in Kimble County, Texas and attended schools in the Junction Independent School District. He earned a Bachelor of Science degree in agricultural development from Texas A&M University and a Juris Doctor from the Texas Tech University School of Law.

Career 
Murr became a Kimble County judge in 2008, serving until 2013. He was appointed to the Concho Valley Regional Review Board by then-Governor Rick Perry in 2011. Murr was elected to the Texas House of Representatives in 2014 and assumed office in 2015. In the 2019–2020 legislative session, Murr served as the vice chair of the Juvenile Justice & Family Issues Committee. In the 2020–2021 session, he is the chair of the House Corrections Committee.

References

External links
 Campaign website
 State legislative page

1977 births
Living people
Texas lawyers
People from Kimble County, Texas
People from Junction, Texas
Texas A&M University alumni
Texas Tech University School of Law alumni
Republican Party members of the Texas House of Representatives